Miscarriage risks are those circumstances, conditions, and substances that increase the risk of miscarriage. Some risks are modifiable and can be changed. Other risks cannot be modified and can't be changed. Risks can be firmly tied to miscarriages and others are still under investigation. In addition, there are those circumstances and treatments that have not been found effective in preventing miscarriage. When a woman keeps having miscarriages, infertility is present.
 Anatomical defect in the mother
 Amniocentesis
 Chorionic villus sampling
 Age >30
 Smoking and exposure tobacco smoke
 Obesity
 Diabetes
 Thyroid disorders (e.g. hypothyroidism)
 Alcohol use
 Cannabis use
 Chromosomal abnormalities
 Infectious diseases
 Radiation exposure
 Endocrine
 Genetic and chromosome abnormalities
 Autosomal trisomy
 Monosomy X (45, X)
 Triploidy
 Structural abnormality of the chromosome
 Double or triple trisomy
 Uterine structural abnormalities
 Uterine fibroids
 Cervical abnormalities
 Hormonal abnormalities
 Reproductive tract infection
 Tissue rejection
 Autoimmune disorder
 Coeliac disease
 Lupus
 Antiphospholipid antibody syndrome
 Anti-thyroid autoantibodies
 Placenta abnormality
 Previous miscarriage
 Eating disorders bulimia nervosa and anorexia nervosa
 Hyperemesis gravidarum 
 Illicit or recreational drugs
 Caffeine
 Food poisoning
 Salmonella
 Listeriosis
 Toxoplasmosis
 Some surgeries and medications
 Antidepressants 
 Nonsteroidal anti-inflammatory drugs, such as ibuprofen
 Methotrexate
 Retinoids
 Trauma
 Chemotherapy
 Polycystic ovary syndrome (PCOS)
 Luteal phase defect
 Mycoplasma genitalium infection
 Rubella (German measles)
 Cytomegalovirus
 Bacterial vaginosis
 Sexually transmitted infections HIV, chlamydia, gonorrhoea and syphilis
 Malaria
 Chemicals
 DDT
 Lead
 Formaldehyde
 Arsenic
 Benzene
 Ethylene oxide
 Working conditions
 Night shift work
 >40-hour work week
 Lack of accommodation for strenuous working conditions
 Psychological stress

References

Bibliography

External links 

Sex chromosome aneuploidies
Miscarriage